Middle Falls is a hamlet within the town of Greenwich in Washington County, New York, United States. Middle Falls has a post office with ZIP code 12848, which opened on January 12, 1832.

References

Hamlets in Washington County, New York
Hamlets in New York (state)